The 2021 Big 12 Conference softball tournament was held at ASA Hall of Fame Stadium in Oklahoma City, Oklahoma on May 14 and May 15, 2021. As the winner of the tournament, Oklahoma earned the conference's automatic bid to the 2021 NCAA Division I softball tournament. Most of the games of the tournament aired on ESPN+. However, the first game aired on ESPNU and the championship game aired on ESPN2. The Oklahoma Sooners came into the tournament with the best record from conference play at 16–1.

Standings

 Kansas did not participate in the tournament

Format and seeding 
The top six teams based on conference winning percentage from the conference's regular season were seeded one through six. Teams were divided into two pools of three teams each. The winners of each pool advanced to the championship game. The second- and third-place teams in each pool played in classification games for third and fifth place, respectively.

Tournament
Sources:

Pool A
No. 4 Baylor vs. No. 6 Texas Tech
No. 6 Texas Tech wins 8–6

No. 1 Oklahoma vs. No. 4 Baylor
No. 1 Oklahoma wins 10–2

No. 1 Oklahoma vs. No. 6 Texas Tech
No. 1 Oklahoma wins 8–2

Pool B
No. 2 Oklahoma State vs. No. 3 Texas
No. 2 Oklahoma State wins 3–2

No. 3 Texas vs. No. 5 Iowa State
No. 3 Texas wins 7–4

No. 2 Oklahoma State vs. No. 5 Iowa State
No. 2 Oklahoma State wins 6–5

Championship Day
No. 4 Baylor vs. No. 5 Iowa State
Iowa State wins 3–1

No. 6 Texas Tech vs. No. 3 Texas
Texas Tech wins 5–1

No. 1 Oklahoma vs. No. 2 Oklahoma State
No. 1 Oklahoma wins 10–2 (6)

Schedule

All-Tournament Team
The following players were named to the all-tournament team:

References

Big 12 Conference softball tournament
Tournament
Big 12 softball tournament